Mont Avril is a mountain of the Pennine Alps, located on the Swiss-Italian border. Its summit has an elevation of 3,347 metres above sea level and can be reached by a trail from the Fenêtre de Durand (2,800 m).  Mont Avril is considered the smaller brother of Mont Gelé.

References

External links
 Mont Avril on Hikr

Mountains of the Alps
Alpine three-thousanders
Mountains of Aosta Valley
Italy–Switzerland border
International mountains of Europe
Mountains of Valais
Mountains of Switzerland